The Scott–Walker House is a historic home located near Saltville, Smyth County, Virginia. It was built about 1800, and is a two-story, three bay, limestone dwelling with a hall-parlor-plan on each floor.  It has a side gable roof and exterior end chimneys.  A one-story, three room wing was added in 1992 and garage in 1993.  It is the oldest known stone farmhouse in Smyth County.

It was listed on the National Register of Historic Places in 1994.

References

Houses on the National Register of Historic Places in Virginia
Houses completed in 1800
Houses in Smyth County, Virginia
National Register of Historic Places in Smyth County, Virginia